Köstence railway station is a railway station in Ankara, Turkey, on the Başkentray commuter rail line. The original station was built in 1970 by the Turkish State Railways and entered service in 1972 as a station on the Ankara suburban. The first station consisted of an island platform with two tracks.

In 2016, the station was closed, demolished and rebuilt to accommodate higher capacity. The new station consists of an island platform serving two tracks, with two more tracks on the south side for intercity and high-speed trains. Köstence was reopened on 12 April 2018.

References

External links
TCDD Taşımacılık
EGO Genel Müdürlüğü

Railway stations in Ankara Province
Railway stations opened in 1972
1972 establishments in Turkey